Empire Township is located in McLean County, Illinois. As of the 2010 census, its population was 4,093 and it contained 1,719 housing units. Empire Township changed its name from Le Roy Township on May 17, 1858.

Geography

Demographics

References

External links
City-data.com
Illinois State Archives

Townships in McLean County, Illinois
Townships in Illinois